Guy Dejouany (15 December 1920 – 14 November 2011) was the CEO of Compagnie Générale des Eaux, (currently known as Vivendi, a French company part of the CAC 40) from 1976 to 1995.

Guy Dejouany worked as Chief Executive Officer of Vinci PLC from 1990 to 1996. He was the Honorary Chairman of Vivendi Universal. 
He played an important role in Vinci PLC's Supervisory Board as Chairman from 1988 to 1990. He is the Director of Vivendi Universal Publishing. He serves as a member of the Supervisory Boards of Dalkia and Compagnie des Eaux et de l'Ozone. He is a permanent representative of Vivendi Universal on the Board of Directors of UGC. He is part-owner and the Director of Alcatel-Lucent. He is also a member of the councils D E monitoring of Dalkia and of the Ozone and Water-company. He is a graduate of École Polytechnique and École Nationale des Ponts et Chaussées.

Guy Dejouany was a French businessman, former President of the French group Générale des Eaux from 1976 to 1996, and one of the most emblematic leaders in the period 1970-2000 France.

He had been nicknamed the Sphinx, or The Duke of Anjou (the headquarters of CGE being on the street of Anjou in Paris).

Biography 
Dejouany was born in Paris on 15 December 1920. Only child of André and Jean (née Imbart) Dejouany. His father was a French civil servant, working for the French Administration, including the French colonial administration, his mother was a homemaker. Algeria, Madagascar, Senegal were major career assignments of his father.

He followed his schooling in Paris at Fénelon and Condorcet. A graduate of the  École Polytechnique and the École Nationale des Ponts et Chaussées.

After having been the chief executive officer during the previous twenty years, he took George Huvelin's succession at the head of the Compagnie Générale des Eaux in 1976; there he would be the managing director until 1996.

The presidency of C.G.E. 

During his presidency of C.G.E, Dejouany transformed the company from a national firm focused on the water business, to an international conglomerate.

Guy Dejouany prevented the nationalization of the Générale des Eaux in 1983. At that time, Jacques Delors was Minister of industry, and decided to buy it back via Saint-Gobain - company actions to achieve the blocking minority and thus influence the future of the group. François Mitterrand, the French President at that time, intervened in favour of the C.G.E. To follow two groups' cross-participation, thus participating in the creation of the famous hard cores in French Defence organized to withstand hostile Takeovers abroad.

In 1984, the company invested in the audio-visual sector with Havas by creating Canal +. Later in the company created SFR, the first French private telephone operator.

Civil engineering and construction industry develops through particular companies Campenon Bernard SGE (Société Générale d'Entreprises).

At the same time, new trades are explored: collection and treatment of waste, passenger transport. Complementary trades are also reinforced: heating, electricity, and heat production. New services were introduced (babysitting, green spaces, disinfection, parking lots). Other trades are born as the company General health has become quickly first l France private hospital.

In the middle of the 1990s and under the reign of Dejouany, the company became one of the largest holdings in the world with over 2300 integrated companies consolidations. Expansion in volume and ambition is then equivalent to the United States, with General Electric.

Guy Dejouany left his footprint on the history of the group in the form of  his work ethics based on discretion and the spirit of conquest.

Jean-Marie Messier was Guy Dejouany's successor, and through his modernization, the conglomerate includes some of the several world leaders in their respective fields: VINCI, Veolia Environnement, Vivendi.

Family 
Guy Dejouany has three children, Capucine, Melchior, and Gonzague, born of his union with Véronique Honoré, who died in 1985.

Decorations 
 Commandeur de l'Ordre de la Légion d'honneur
Commandeur de l'Ordre de Saint-Charles
Awarded from the Order of Leopold

References 

1920 births
2011 deaths
Businesspeople from Paris
French chief executives